Tapio Antero Levo (born September 24, 1956, in Pori, Finland) is a retired Finnish professional ice hockey player who played in the SM-liiga and National Hockey League.  He played for Ässät in Finland, and the New Jersey Devils and Colorado Rockies in the NHL.  He was inducted into the Finnish Hockey Hall of Fame in 1995. He also played for Finland in the 1980 Winter Olympics and scored the team's first goal of the tournament and registered four assists as well.

Career statistics

Regular season and playoffs

International

External links
 Finnish Hockey Hall of Fame bio

1956 births
Living people
Ässät players
Colorado Rockies (NHL) players
Finnish ice hockey defencemen
HPK players
Ice hockey players at the 1980 Winter Olympics
Ice hockey players with retired numbers
New Jersey Devils players
Olympic ice hockey players of Finland
Sportspeople from Pori
Pittsburgh Penguins draft picks